Royal Swedish Navy Band, is one of three professional military bands in the Swedish Armed Forces. The band is stationed at Karlskrona, was formed in 1680 and is mainly active in the south part of the country with concerts and regimental ceremonies but has also a major part in the state ceremonial, royal pageants and changing the King's guard at the Stockholm Palace in Stockholm. The Swedish Armed Forces Music Corps heads all bands in the Swedish Armed Forces.

History 
The earliest mentioning in writing of the band is at the inauguration of the Karlskrona Admiralty Church in 1685, whereas the musicians went about the town to give the word for the ceremony next Sunday. In 1780 the music at the naval base was formed as two bands of the Första och Andra volontärregementet eng. 1st and 2nd Naval Regiment. In 1804 the two bands were amalgamated into the band of the Naval Artillery Regiment (Sjöartilleriregementet) and later transferred to the Marine Regiment (Marinregementet).

As the Marine Regiment was disbanded between 1871 and 1877 the music and leading musicians at the Karlskrona station was gradually transferred to the band of the Corps of Naval Volunteers which later was the basis for the band of the Royal Swedish Navy. Sergeant-Major August Fiedler late of the band of The Marine Regiment was the first Director of Music of the Royal Swedish Navy Band and his successor in 1873 was Frans Ferdinand Heimdal

In the Swedish navy all musicians had second tasks aboard and ashore and must therefore be considered part-time musicians. The band used brass instruments only with main task to provide men o’ war with buglers and ensembles. In 1915 Director of Music Heimdal was succeeded by Georg Ringvall which reorganized the band and introduced woodwind instruments.

Directors of Music

August Friedrich Fiedler, 1862–1875
Frans Ferdinand Heimdahl, 1875–1915
Georg Ringvall, 1915–1935
Harry Olsson, 1935–1944
John Skoglöf, 1944–1957
Sune Sundberg, 1957–1960
Åke Dohlin, 1960–1973
Per Ohlsson, 1973–1975
Egon Kjerrman, 1975–1979
Folke Nilsson, 1979–1988
Folke Nilsson, 1988–1989
Vacant, 1989–1993
Per Ohlsson, 1993–1998
Andreas Hanson, 1998–2010
Vacant, 2010-2018
, 2018-today

Composition
The wind ensemble consists of: 2 flutes, 1 oboe, 1 bassoon, 7 clarinets, 2 saxophones, 3 French horns, 4 trumpets/cornets, 3 trombones, 1 euphonium, 2 tubas, a percussion section that includes 3 players, and 1 double bass (in concert formation).

Gallery

Sources
Rostin, Per (1994): Flottans musikkår. Karlskrona: Abrahamsons Tryckeri AB

References

External links

Marinens musikkår

Swedish military bands
Musical groups established in the 17th century